Everyday I Have the Blues is an album by singer Joe Williams with Count Basie and His Orchestra featuring tracks recorded in 1959 (with one track from 1957 on the original LP) which was originally released on the Roulette label.

Reception

AllMusic awarded the album 4 stars and its review by John Bush states, "Joe Williams had enlivened the Count Basie band for so long that it was natural for Basie and company to return the favor on his 1959 solo LP for Roulette. And with a trio of Basie arrangers – Frank Foster, Ernie Wilkins, Thad Jones – providing charts for a rather small group here, the results are excellent".

In DownBeat, Ralph Gleason finds "the Basie band really shining as
an accompanying instrument" and argues this is Williams' "best album under his own name."

Track listing
 "Everyday" (William York) – 4:43
 "Baby Won't You Please Come Home" (Charles Warfield, Clarence Williams) – 1:58
 "Going to Chicago Blues" (Count Basie, Jimmy Rushing) – 4:08 (this track was originally released on Sing Along With Basie; not on CD reissue)
 "Gee, Baby, Ain't I Good to You" (Andy Razaf, Don Redman) – 2:28
 "It's a Low Down Dirty Shame" (Ollie Shepard) – 5:23 
 "Shake, Rattle and Roll" (Charles Calhoun) – 2:14
 "Just a Dream" (Big Bill Broonzy) – 2:53
 "Cherry Red" (Pete Johnson) – 2:53
 "Good Mornin' Blues" (Basie, Eddie Durham, Rushing) – 2:51
 "What Did You Win" (Sid Wyche, R. Watts) – 2:17
 "Ain't No Use" (Wyche, Leroy Kirkland) – 2:56
 "Confessin' the Blues" (Jay McShann, Walter Brown) – 2:48 (bonus track on CD reissue)
 "Five O'Clock in the Morning" (Joe Williams) – 3:15 (bonus track on CD reissue)
 "How Can You Lose" (Benny Carter) – 2:34 (bonus track on CD reissue)
Recorded on September 19, 1957, at Capitol Studios in New York City (tracks 4 & 12), and at Universal Studios in Chicago on March 4, 1958 (tracks 13 & 14) and September 24 & 25, 1959 (tracks 1–2 & 5–11)

Personnel 
Joe Williams – vocals
Count Basie – piano
John Anderson (tracks 1–2 & 5–11), Wendell Culley (tracks 4 & 12–14), Thad Jones, Joe Newman, Snooky Young – trumpet
Henry Coker, Al Grey (tracks 1–2, 5–11, 13 & 14), Bill Hughes (tracks 13 & 14), Benny Powell – trombone
Marshal Royal – alto saxophone, clarinet
Frank Wess – alto saxophone, tenor saxophone, flute
Eddie "Lockjaw" Davis (tracks 4 & 12), Frank Foster, Billy Mitchell (tracks 1–2, 5–11, 13 & 14) – tenor saxophone
Charlie Fowlkes – baritone saxophone
Freddie Green – guitar
Eddie Jones – bass
Sonny Payne – drums

References 

1959 albums
Count Basie Orchestra albums
Joe Williams (jazz singer) albums
Roulette Records albums
Albums produced by Teddy Reig